Căpoteşti may refer to several places in Romania:

Căpoteşti, a village in Huruiești Commune, Bacău County
Căpoteşti, a village in Pădureni Commune, Vaslui County